Harmony, also known as Node 2, is the "utility hub" of the International Space Station. It connects the laboratory modules of the United States, Europe and Japan, as well as providing electrical power and electronic data. Sleeping cabins for four of the crew are housed here.

Harmony was successfully launched into space aboard Space Shuttle flight STS-120 on 23 October 2007. After temporarily being attached to the port side of the Unity module, it was moved to its permanent location on the forward end of the Destiny module on 14 November 2007. Its successful installation meant that from NASA's perspective, the station was considered to be "U.S. Core Complete".

Origin of name 

The unit formerly known as Node 2 was renamed Harmony in March 2004. The name was chosen in a competition where more than 2,200 students from 32 states participated.  The Node 2 Challenge required students to learn about the space station, build a scale model, and write an essay explaining their proposed name for the module, which will serve as a central hub for science labs. The six winning classes were: Paul Cummins' 8th grade class at Browne Academy, Alexandria, Va.; Sue Wilson's 3rd grade class at Buchanan Elementary School, Baton Rouge, La.; Brigette Berry's 8th grade class at League City Intermediate School, League City, Texas; Bradley Neu's 9th grade science class at Lubbock High School, Lubbock, Texas; Russell Yocum 's 3rd grade class at West Navarre Intermediate School, Navarre, Fla.; and, David Dexheimer's students at the World Group Home School, Monona, Wisconsin.

Specifications 

Harmony is the second of three node modules on the United States Orbital Segment (USOS). It is protected from micrometeoroids by 98 panels, each made from a composite sandwich of stainless steel and 6061-T6 aluminium alloy, and a secondary barrier of Kevlar/resin. The design is based on the existing Multi-Purpose Logistics Module, as well as the European Space Agency's Columbus module (both of which have only one passive Common Berthing Mechanism [CBM]). There are six CBMs on Harmony: the aft CBM that connects it to Destiny is passive; the rest are active.

Harmony is managed by NASA's Marshall Space Flight Center in Huntsville, Alabama. Its deployment expanded the Space Station, allowing it to grow from the size of a three-bedroom house, to the space equivalent of a typical five-bedroom house, once the Japanese Kibō and European Columbus laboratories are attached. The Space Station robotic arm, Canadarm2, is able to operate from a powered grapple fixture on the exterior of Harmony. Harmony is equipped with eight International Standard Payload Racks: four avionics racks and four for stowage or crew quarters. The first two were delivered on STS-126 and the second two on STS-128. After the cancellation of the Habitation Module, Harmony was chosen to house the American Crew Quarters.

Construction agreement 
In an agreement between NASA and the European Space Agency, the company Thales Alenia Space, built Harmony at its facility in Turin, Italy. Harmony arrived on 1 June 2003 at the Kennedy Space Center in Florida after its flight in an Airbus Beluga oversize cargo vehicle. Following post transportation inspection, the Italian Space Agency (ASI) formally handed over Harmony  to the European Space Agency (ESA). From there, ESA formally transferred ownership of Harmony to NASA on 18 June 2003, taking place in the Space Station Processing Facility (SSPF) of the Kennedy Space Center. The handover of Harmony completed a major element of the barter agreement, between ESA and NASA, that was signed in Turin, Italy on 8 October 1997.

Paolo Nespoli, an ESA astronaut born in Milan, Italy, accompanied the Harmony module aboard STS-120 as a mission specialist.

Launch 

Harmony was launched on 23 October 2007 aboard of the STS-120, as the primary component of assembly mission ISS-10A.

On 26 October 2007, the station's Space Station Remote Manipulator System (SSRMS) removed Harmony from the shuttle cargo bay and temporarily mated it to the port side of Unity and, on 27 October 2007, the crew entered in Harmony. After the Space Shuttle was departed, Harmony was relocated to the forward dock of the Destiny laboratory. It required three EVAs by the station crew to complete the installation.

Connecting modules and visiting vehicles 

Harmony was the first permanent living space enlargement to the ISS after the Pirs docking compartment was added in 2001. The Expedition 16 crew moved the Pressurized Mating Adapter (PMA-2) on 12 November 2007 from Destiny to the forward berth of Harmony. The combined PMA-2/Harmony unit was subsequently berthed to its final destination at the forward end of Destiny on 14 November 2007. All the following Space Shuttle missions would dock at this location.

On 11 February 2008, ESA's Columbus laboratory was attached to the starboard hatch of the Harmony module during space shuttle mission STS-122. On 14 March 2008, the Experiment Logistics Module Pressurized Section (ELM-PS) of Kibō was attached to its interim location: the zenith hatch of Harmony. During STS-124, a Space Shuttle mission flown by Space Shuttle Discovery, the Pressurized Module of Kibō was added to the port side of Harmony and the ELM-PS was moved, leaving the zenith hatch empty. The zenith hatch was originally intended to be the permanent docking connector for the now canceled Centrifuge Accommodations Module (CAM).

When the Space Shuttle flew the Multi-Purpose Logistics Modules (MPLMs) to the station, the MPLM would be temporarily berthed to the nadir mechanism of Harmony. The Japanese H-II Transfer Vehicle and the American Commercial Resupply Service (COTS) vehicles, Dragon and Cygnus, are temporarily berthed to either the nadir or zenith mechanism.

In August 2016, the forward docking port was equipped with the International Docking Adapter (IDA) delivered with the CRS-9 mission. This adapter was used for the first time for the automatic docking of the Crew Dragon spacecraft during its uncrewed test mission on 3 March 2019.

On 26 March 2017, PMA-3 was robotically removed from the Tranquility module and attached to the zenith port of the Harmony module after being prepared during a successful spacewalk on 24 March 2017. A second spacewalk was conducted on 30 March 2017 to finalize the PMA-3 cable connections on Harmony. PMA-3 is linked to the International Docking Adapter-3 adapter, delivered on the SpaceX CRS-18 mission in July 2019. IDA-3 was fully linked to PMA-3 during an EVA on 21 August 2019.

References

External links 

 Node 2 specifications from the ESA
 STS-120 mission page
 NASA - Harmony Node 2
 Thales Alenia Space page for Node 2

Components of the International Space Station
Spacecraft launched in 2007